The Women's Laser Radial World Championships have been held every year since 1980, organized by the International Sailing Federation.  Laser Radial is an Olympic sailing class. The event was held together with the Men's Laser Radial World Championships between 1989 and 2010.

Editions

Medalists

Multiple medalists

See also
ISAF Sailing World Championships
Laser World Championships
Laser 4.7 World Championships

References

External links
2015 World Championship results
Sailing competitions
World Champs – Laser Radial
Sailing World Championships – Men Laser Radial from site Sports123.com (by Internet Archive)
Sailing World Championships – Women Laser Radial from site Sports123.com (by Internet Archive)

Laser Radial World Championships
Recurring sporting events established in 1980
World championships in sailing
Women's world sailing championships